WXGM may refer to:

 WXGM (AM), a radio station (1420 AM) licensed to serve Gloucester, Virginia, United States
 WXGM-FM, a radio station (99.1 FM) licensed to serve Gloucester, Virginia